The British Rail Class 44 or Sulzer Type 4 diesel locomotives were built by British Railways' Derby Works between 1959 and 1960, intended for express passenger services. They were originally numbered D1-D10 and named after British mountains, and, along with the similar Class 45 and 46 locomotives, they became known as Peaks.

Overview
In part inspired by LMS prototypes 10000 and 10001, and by Southern Railway 10201-10203, the Class 44 diesels were some of the first big diesels commissioned for the British Rail modernisation project and were the precursors to the Class 45 and Class 46 locomotives of similar design. They were originally designed to have a Co-Co wheel arrangement, but it proved impossible to keep below the  axle loading limit imposed by the British Railways Civil Engineer. A 1-Co bogie design originally used on the Southern Railway 10201 was used instead.

Construction began in the summer of 1958, although the first example was not completed until April 1959. The ten locomotives were originally allocated to Camden motive power depot and used on the West Coast Main Line, although also often seen on the Midland Main Line. However, with the advent of large numbers of Class 45 locomotives the 10 Class 44 locomotives were transferred to Toton.

Powertrain
A 2,300 bhp Sulzer 12LDA28-A diesel engine drove a Crompton Parkinson GC426-A1 main generator which supplied power to six Crompton Parkinson C171-B1 traction motors. When initially put into service, the locomotives were fitted with multiple working.

They were geared for 90 mph running, although D2 was experimentally geared to run faster than this and was also fitted temporarily with the first intercooled 2,500 bhp B model of the engine. In 1962 it managed 110 mph with three-coach test trains on the West Coast Main Line. This was not intended as a high-speed trial of the Peaks, but to study the condition of the line, before electrification and sustained high-speed running over it.

By 1960, the next batch of Peaks, D11 and the class 45s, were in production. These had lowered motor gearing from 62/17 to 57/22 which reduced the tractive effort, but also reduced traction motor rpm at speed and so reduced the risk of flashover. In 1961, the same gearing change was applied to the class 44s, reducing their continuous tractive effort from 41,000 to 29,000 lbf.

Teething troubles

The class suffered 'a considerable amount of early "teething trouble"' during the early 1960s. The bogies suffered from frame fractures. The vacuum exhausters gave trouble, as did the auxiliary motor, the original batteries supplied were also inadequate and soon became exhausted. The main problem with the exhausters was that they were mounted in the centre of the engine room and so had to be lifted through the roof by crane, taking 8–12 hours to change. The truss girder used for the body sides meant that there was no access through the sides of the bodywork. Considerable trouble was experienced with the water tanks for the steam heating boilers due to fractures.

Once the class 45 units were available, the locomotives were re-assigned to Toton and freight duties, and the steam heating boilers were removed.

Operations
The class worked regularly over the West Coast Main Line for a couple of years prior to its electrification, and also between London St Pancras and Manchester Central. Once they were consigned to Freight services, they mostly operated in the East Midlands, all being allocated to Toton until withdrawal.

Renumbering, withdrawal and preservation
The class was renumbered 44 001-010 with the adoption of the Total Operations Processing System in the early 1970s. Withdrawal of the whole class took place between 1976 and 1980.

Two locomotives have survived to preservation.

Fleet details

References

Further reading

44
1Co-Co1 locomotives
Railway locomotives introduced in 1959
Standard gauge locomotives of Great Britain
Diesel-electric locomotives of Great Britain